Allan Quatermain is the protagonist of H. Rider Haggard's 1885 novel King Solomon's Mines, its one sequel Allan Quatermain (1887), twelve prequel novels and four prequel short stories, totalling eighteen works. An English professional big game hunter and adventurer, in film and television he has been portrayed by Richard Chamberlain, Sean Connery, Cedric Hardwicke, Patrick Swayze and Stewart Granger among others.

History 

The character Quatermain is an English-born professional big game hunter and occasional trader living in South Africa. An outdoorsman who finds English cities and climate unbearable, he prefers to spend most of his life in Africa, where he grew up under the care of his widower father, a Christian missionary.

In the earliest-written novels, native Africans refer to Quatermain as Macumazahn, meaning "Watcher-by-Night," a reference to his nocturnal habits and keen instincts. In later-written novels, Macumazahn is said to be a short form of Macumazana, meaning "One who stands out." Quatermain is frequently accompanied by his native servant, the Hottentot Hans, a wise and caring family retainer from his youth. His sarcastic comments offer a sharp critique of European conventions. In his final adventures, Quatermain is joined by two British companions, Sir Henry Curtis and Captain John Good of the Royal Navy, and by his African friend Umslopogaas.

Appearance and character 
The series spans 50 years of Quatermain's life, from 18 to 68; at the start of the foundation novel King Solomon's Mines he has just turned 55, giving him a birthdate of 1830. Physically, he is small, wiry, and unattractive, with a beard and short hair that sticks up. His one skill is his marksmanship, where he has no equal. Quatermain is aware that as a professional hunter, he has helped to destroy his beloved wild free places of Africa. In old age he hunts without pleasure, having no other means of making a living.

About Quatermain's family, little is written. He lives at Durban, in Natal, South Africa. He marries twice, but is quickly widowed both times. He entrusts the printing of memoirs in the series to his son Harry, whose death he mourns in the opening of the novel Allan Quatermain. Harry Quatermain is a medical student who dies of smallpox while working in a hospital. Haggard did not write the Quatermain novels in chronological order, and made errors with some details. Quatermain's birth, age at the time of his marriages, and age at the time of his death cannot be reconciled to the apparent date of Harry's birth and age at death.

Series 
Although some of Haggard's Quatermain novels stand alone, there are two important series. In the Zulu trilogy, Marie (1912), Child of Storm (1913), and Finished (1917), Quatermain becomes ensnared in the vengeance of Zikali, the dwarf wizard known as "The-thing-that-should-never-have-been-born" and "Opener-of-Roads." Zikali plots and finally achieves the overthrow of the Zulu royal House of Senzangakona, founded by Shaka and ending under Cetewayo (Cetshwayo kaMpande) (Haggard's questionable spelling of Zulu names is used in the first instance).

These novels are prequels to the foundation pair, King Solomon's Mines (1885) and Allan Quatermain (1887), which describe Quatermain's discovery of vast wealth, his discontent with a life of ease, and his fatal return to Africa following the death of his son Harry.

With She and Allan (1920), Haggard engineered a crossover between his two most popular series, uniting Quatermain with Ayesha, the central character of his hugely successful "She" novels, and bringing in several other key characters from each series—Hans, Umslopogaas, and Zikali from the Quatermain series, and Bilali, Ayesha's faithful minister. This book formed the third part of the "She" trilogy, although in chronological terms, it necessarily served as a prequel to the first two "She" books, since Holly and Leo, the protagonists of the first two books, both die at the end of the second novel.

Chronology of Haggard's Allan Quatermain, Ayesha, and Umslopogaas stories 

Dates of events in Allan Quatermain's life and Ayesha's are given as "Chronological year" (left). Dates of first publication in book form are given as "Publication year" (right).

The four Ayesha novels are marked (*). Allan Quatermain and Umslopogaas appears only in She and Allan (1921), third-published of the four and second in the Ayesha chronology.

The three Umslopogaas novels are marked (**). Ayesha appears only in She and Allan (1921), third-published of the three and second in the Umslopogaas chronology. Allan appears there and in Allan Quatermain (1887), first-published of the three and last in the Umslopogaas chronology—as in Allan's own. That story is set in 1884–1885; only Ayesha: The Return of She (1905) is set later, in 1899.

Publications

Books written by H. Rider Haggard 
 King Solomon's Mines (1885)
 Allan Quatermain (1887)
 Maiwa's Revenge: or, The War of the Little Hand (1888)
 Allan's Wife and Other Tales (1889)
 "Allan's Wife"
 "Hunter Quatermain's Story"
 "A Tale of Three Lions"
 "Long Odds"
 Marie (1912)
 Child of Storm (1913)
 The Holy Flower (1915) (first serialised in the Windsor Magazine, December 1913 – November 1914)
 The Ivory Child (1916)
 Finished (1917)
 The Ancient Allan (1920)
 She and Allan (1920)
 Heu-heu: or, The Monster (1924)
 The Treasure of the Lake (1926)
 Allan and the Ice-gods (1927)
 Hunter Quatermain's Story: The Uncollected Adventures of Allan Quatermain (collection, 2003)
 "Hunter Quatermain's Story" (first published in In a Good Cause, 1885)
 "Long Odds" (first published in Macmillan's Magazine February 1886)
 "A Tale of Three Lions" (first serialized in Atalanta, October–December 1887)
 "Magepa the Buck" (first published in Pears' Annual, 1912)

Books written by Alan Moore 
The character was used by writer Alan Moore and artist Kevin O'Neill in their comic book series The League of Extraordinary Gentlemen, adapted to film in 2003, based on the premise that he faked his death to enjoy a quiet retirement.

 The League of Extraordinary Gentlemen, Volume One ("Allan and the Sundered Veil")
 The League of Extraordinary Gentlemen, Volume II ("The New Traveller's Almanac")
 The League of Extraordinary Gentlemen: Black Dossier
 The League of Extraordinary Gentlemen, Volume III: Century

Other literary works 

The Allan Quatermain character has been expanded greatly by modern writers; this use is possibly due to Haggard's works passing into the public domain, much like Sherlock Holmes.

One of the Sherlock Holmes pastiches of James Lovegrove, The Devil's Dust (2018), features both Holmes and Quatermain.

In 2005, an Allan Quatermain and Sherlock Holmes novel by Thomas Kent Miller, The Great Detective at the Crucible of Life, was published by Wildside Press.

In film and television 
The Allan Quatermain character has appeared in the following film and television works:
 Allan Quatermain (1919), a silent film starring Albert Lawrence, believed to be lost
 King Solomon's Mines (1937), a British film starring Cedric Hardwicke
 King Solomon's Mines (1950), an American film starring Stewart Granger
 King Solomon's Treasure (1979), a British-Canadian low-budget film starring John Colicos
 King Solomon's Mines (1985), an American film starring Richard Chamberlain
 Allan Quatermain and the Lost City of Gold , a 1986 sequel again starring Chamberlain
 King Solomon's Mines (1986), an Australian animated film, with Quatermain voiced by Arthur Dignam
  The League of Extraordinary Gentlemen, with Sean Connery as Allan Quatermain
 King Solomon's Mines (2004), an American television miniseries starring Patrick Swayze as "Allan Quartermain"
 Allan Quatermain and the Temple of Skulls (2008), a direct-to-DVD film starring Sean Cameron Michael

In addition, the 1959 film Watusi, a sequel to the 1950 film King Solomon's Mines, stars George Montgomery as Allan Quatermain's son, Harry Quatermain.

Influences 

The real-life adventures of Frederick Selous, the British big game hunter and explorer of Africa, inspired Haggard to create the Allan Quatermain character. Haggard was also heavily influenced by other larger-than-life adventurers whom he later met in Africa, most notably American Scout Frederick Russell Burnham. He was further influenced by South Africa's vast mineral wealth and by the ruins of ancient lost civilizations being uncovered in Africa, such as Great Zimbabwe. The similarities are striking between Haggard's close friend Burnham and his Quatermain character: both were small and wiry Victorian adventurers in Africa; both sought and discovered ancient treasures and civilizations; both battled large wild animals and native peoples; both were renowned for their ability to track, even at night; and both men had similar nicknames (Quatermain, "Watcher-by-Night"; Burnham, "He-who-sees-in-the-dark").

The beliefs and views of the fictional Quatermain aped those of Haggard himself, and beliefs that were common among the 19th-century Europeans. These include conventional Victorian ideas concerning the superiority of the white race; an admiration for "warrior races," such as the Zulu; a disdain for natives corrupted by white influences; and a general contempt for Afrikaners (Boers). But in other ways Haggard's views were advanced for his times. The first chapter of King Solomon's Mines contains an express denunciation of the use of the pejorative term "nigger." Quatermain frequently encounters natives who are more brave and wise than Europeans, and women (black and white) who are smarter and emotionally stronger than men (though not necessarily as good; cf. the title character of "She"). Through the Quatermain novels and his other works, Haggard also expresses his own mysticism and interest in non-Christian concepts, particularly karma and reincarnation, though he expresses these concepts in such a way as to be compatible with the Christian faith.

Influenced 
Quatermain was one of the templates for the American film character Indiana Jones.

The route to King Solomon's Mines described by Haggard was also referred to in the movie The Librarian: Return to King Solomon's Mines, specifically the reference to Sheba's Breasts and Three Witches Mountain, which are geographical features mentioned by Quatermain in the novel.

In the Graham Greene novel The Heart of the Matter (1948), the main character Scobie remembers Allan Quatermain as his childhood hero.

In popular culture 
 The video game Deadfall Adventures explores the adventures of James Lee Quatermain, the great-grandson of Allan, in the 1930s.

References

Sources 
 Allan Quatermain, from International Catalogue of Superheroes website

External links 

 
 
 
 
 
 
 
 
 
 
 
 
 
 She and Allan Quatermain Series - at the Internet Archive

H. Rider Haggard characters
Series of books
Fantasy books by series
Characters in fantasy literature
Fictional treasure hunters
Fictional explorers
Africa in fiction
Novels set in Africa
Literary characters introduced in 1885
Fictional English people
Fictional South African people
America's Best Comics characters
Victorian era in popular culture